Rockfish is an unincorporated community in Nelson County, Virginia, United States.

Overview
It was among the communities severely affected by flash flooding from Hurricane Camille in 1969.

Rockfish was frequently referenced in the CBS television series The Waltons as being the closest town to Waltons Mountain, the fictional version of the nearby community of Schuyler.

The community is also known as "Rockfish Depot" even though the railroad depot building has been gone for decades.

Climate
The climate in this area is characterized by hot, humid summers and generally mild to cool winters.  According to the Köppen Climate Classification system, Rockfish has a humid subtropical climate, abbreviated "Cfa" on climate maps.

References

Unincorporated communities in Nelson County, Virginia
Unincorporated communities in Virginia